The Patriarch of the Church of the East (also known as Patriarch of the East, Patriarch of Babylon, the Catholicose of the East or the Grand Metropolitan of the East) is the patriarch, or leader and head bishop (sometimes referred to as Catholicos or universal leader) of the Church of the East. The position dates to the early centuries of Christianity within the Sassanid Empire, and the Church has been known by a variety of names, including the Church of the East, Nestorian Church, the Persian Church, the Sassanid Church, or East Syrian.

Since 1552, rival patriarchal lines were established, traditionalist on one side and pro-Catholic on the other. In modern times, patriarchal succession is claimed from this office to the patriarchal offices of the successor churches: the Chaldean Catholic Church, the Assyrian Church of the East, and the Ancient Church of the East.

Early history of the Patriarchate of the East 

The geographic location of the patriarchate was first in Edessa and then transferred to the Persian capital of Seleucia-Ctesiphon in central Mesopotamia during the Roman conquest of Edessa. In the 9th century the patriarchate moved to Baghdad and then through various cities in what was then Assyria (Assuristan/Athura) and is now northern Iraq, south east Turkey and northwest Iran, including, Tabriz, Mosul, and Maragheh on Lake Urmia. Following the Chaldean Catholic Church split from the Assyrian Church, the respective patriarchs of these churches continued to move around northern Iraq. In the 19th century, the patriarchate of the Assyrian Church of the East was in the village of Qudshanis in southeastern Turkey. In the 20th century, the Assyrian patriarch went into exile, relocating to Chicago, Illinois, United States. Another patriarchate, which split off in the 1960s as the Ancient Church of the East, is in Baghdad.

The patriarchate of the Church of the East evolved from the position of the leader of the Christian community in Seleucia-Ctesiphon, the Persian capital. While Christianity had been introduced into Assyria then largely under the rule of the Parthian Empire in the first centuries AD, during the earliest period, leadership was unorganized and there was no established succession. In 280, Papa bar Aggai was consecrated as Bishop of Seleucia-Ctesiphon by two visiting bishops, Akha d'abuh' of Arbela and Hai-Beël of Susa, thereby establishing the generally recognized succession. Seleucia-Ctesiphon thus became its own episcopal see, and exerted some de facto control over the wider Persian Christian community. Papa's successors began to use the title of Catholicos, a Roman designation probably adopted due to its use by the Catholicos of Armenia, though at first it carried no formal recognition. In 409 the Church of the East received state recognition from the Sassanid Emperor Yazdegerd I, and the Council of Seleucia-Ctesiphon was called, at which the church's hierarchy was formalized. Bishop Mar Isaac was the first to be officially styled Catholicos over all of the Christians in Persia. Over the next decades, the Catholicoi adopted the additional title of Patriarch, which eventually became the better known designation.

The conventional list of patriarchs of the Church of the East includes around 130 patriarchs. A number of these patriarchs are legendary, or have been included in the standard lists on dubious evidence according to some historians like Jean Maurice Fiey. According to him, the Church of the East, although separated from the State church of the Roman Empire, was not immune to its fashions.  One such fashion was to fill in the inevitable gaps in the historical record to trace a succession of bishops in individual dioceses right back to the 1st century, preferably to an apostolic founder.  This fashion found particular favour in the case of the diocese of Seleucia-Ctesiphon.  The first bishop of Seleucia-Ctesiphon for whom incontestable evidence exists was Papa, who was consecrated around 280.  During the 6th century ingenious attempts were made to link Papa with Mari, the legendary apostle of Babylonia.  The author of the 6th-century Acts of Mari simply ignored the gap of two and a half centuries that separated the two men and declared that Mari had founded the diocese of Seleucia-Ctesiphon shortly before his death and consecrated Papa as his successor.  According to Fiey, later writers were more cunning with their inventions.  Shahlufa and Ahadabui, two late-3rd-century bishops of Erbil who had played a notable part in the affairs of the church of Seleucia-Ctesiphon, were 'converted' retrospectively into early patriarchs.  Ahadabui was said to have governed the church of Seleucia-Ctesiphon from 204 to 220, and Shahlufa from 220 to 224. However the Chronicle of Seert, names Shahloopa (Shahlufa) as a Patriarch of the Church of the East. Fiey also claims that, for the 2nd century, three patriarchs were frankly invented:  Abris (121–37), Abraham (159–71) and Yaqob (190). All three men were declared to be relatives of Joseph, the earthly father of Jesus, and given plausible backstories. Fiey also claims these five phantom 'patriarchs' were included in all the later histories of the Church of the East, and by the 12th century their existence was an article of faith for the historian Mari bin Sulaiman. According to Feiy, they are still included by courtesy in the traditional list of patriarchs of the Church of the East, even though most scholars agree that they never existed. However not all historians and ecclesiastical scholars regard Fiey's opinion to be correct.

Uncertain patriarchal succession, 1318–1552 
The patriarch Yahballaha III died in November 1317, probably on Saturday 12 November.

His successor Timothy II, according to the acts of his synod, was consecrated in February 1318.  He was still alive in 1328, but probably died two or three years later, to be succeeded after an uncertain interval by Denha II in 1336/7, who himself died in 1381/2. Denha II is known to have been consecrated in Baghdad, thanks to the patronage of the Christian emir Haggi Togai, but may have been normally resident in the Mosul plain village of Karamlish.  Three ceremonial contacts between Denha II and the Jacobite church are recorded by the continuator of Bar Hebraeus's Ecclesiastical Chronicle between 1358 and 1364, and on each occasion Denha was living in Karamlish.

Denha II is conventionally believed to have been succeeded by the patriarchs Shemʿon II, Shemʿon III and Eliya IV, but a 15th-century list of patriarchs mentions only a single patriarch named Shemon between Denha II and Eliya IV, and is probably to be preferred.

Eliya IV was succeeded by Shemon IV at an unknown date in the first half of the 15th century.  Eliya's death has conventionally been placed in 1437 but must have been earlier, as a patriarch named Shemon is mentioned in a colophon of 1429/30.

Shemʿon IV died on 20 February 1497 and was buried in the monastery of Rabban Hormizd near the Mosul village of Alqosh. He was succeeded by two short-reigned patriarchs:  Shemon V, first mentioned in a colophon of 1500/1, who died in September 1502 and was buried in the monastery of Mar Awgin; and Eliya V, elected in 1503, who died in 1504 and was buried in the church of Mart Meskinta in Mosul.

Eliya V was succeeded by the patriarch Shemon VI (1504–38), who died on 5 August 1538 and was buried in the monastery of Rabban Hormizd. According to the colophon of a contemporary manuscript, the patriarchal throne was still vacant on 19 October 1538.

Shemon's brother the metropolitan Ishoyahb Bar Mama, who had been natar kursya throughout his reign, is first mentioned as patriarch in a colophon of 1539. Shemon VII Ishoyahb died on 1 November 1558 and was buried, like his predecessor, in the monastery of Rabban Hormizd near Alqosh. His reign saw the schism of 1552 that resulted in the creation of the Shimun line in 1553.

'Shemon VIII Denha' and the schism of 1552 

In 1552 a section of the Church of the East, angered by the appointment of minors to important episcopal positions by the patriarch Shemon VII Ishoyahb, revolted against his authority. The rebels elected in his stead Sulaqa, the superior of the monastery of Rabban Hormizd near Alqosh, but were unable to consecrate him as no bishop of metropolitan rank was available, as canonically required. Franciscan missionaries were already at work among the Nestorians, and they persuaded Sulaqa's supporters to legitimize their position by seeking Sulaqa's consecration by Pope Julius III (1550–5).  Sulaqa went to Rome, where he made a satisfactory Catholic profession of faith and presented a letter, drafted by his supporters in Mosul, which set out his claims to be recognized as patriarch. This letter, which has survived in the Vatican archives, grossly distorted the truth. The rebels claimed that the Nestorian patriarch Shemon VII Ishoyahb had died in 1551 and had been succeeded illegitimately by 'Shemon VIII Denha' (1551–8), a non-existent patriarch invented purely for the purpose of bolstering the legitimacy of Sulaqa's election. The Vatican was taken in by this fraud, and recognised Sulaqa as the founding patriarch of the Chaldean Catholic Church in April 1553, thereby creating a lasting schism in the Church of the East.  It was only several years later that the Vatican discovered that Shemon VII Ishoyahb was still alive.

Patriarchal succession, 16th to 18th centuries 
The patriarchal succession after the schism of 1552 is certain in the case of the Mosul patriarchate, because up to the beginning of the 19th century all but one of its patriarchs were buried in the monastery of Rabban Hormizd and their epitaphs, which give the date of their deaths, have survived.  Shemon VII's successor Eliya VI died on 26 May 1591, after having been a metropolitan for 15 years and patriarch for 32 years; Eliya VII on 26 May 1617; Eliya VIII on 18 June 1660; Eliya IX Yohannan on 17 May 1700; Eliya X Marogin on 14 December 1722; and Eliya XII Ishoyahb in 1804. Eliya XI Denha died of plague in Alqosh on 29 April 1778, and was exceptionally buried in the town rather than the monastery, which had been abandoned and locked up following a Persian attack in 1743.

The information available on Sulaqa and his successors is much less exact.  The date of Sulaqa's election in 1552 is not known, but he was confirmed as 'patriarch of Mosul' by the Vatican on 28 April 1553, and was martyred at the beginning of 1555, probably (according to a contemporary poem of Abdisho IV) on 12 January. The date of Abdisho IV’s succession in 1555 is not known, but a colophon mentions that he died on 11 September 1570.  The dates of Shemon VIII Yahballaha's succession and death (presumably in 1570 and 1580 respectively) are not known.  Shemon IX Denha was elected patriarch in 1580 and (according to Assemani) died in 1600.  Shemon X, elected in 1600, is said to have died in 1638, according to a later letter of Eliya XII (d. 1804) cited by Tisserant.

Information on the patriarchal succession in the Qudshanis patriarchate for the remainder of the seventeenth and the whole of the 18th century is equally scanty.  Several of the Qudshanis patriarchs who succeeded Shemon X corresponded with the Vatican, but the surviving correspondence does not enable individual patriarchs to be distinguished.  The following list of 17th- and 18th-century Qudshanis patriarchs has conventionally been adopted, most recently by Fiey and (provisionally) by Wilmshurst:  Shemon XI (1638–56), Shemon XII (1656–62), Shemon XIII Denha (1662–1700), Shemon XIV Shlemun (1700–40), Shemon XVI Mikhail Mukhtas (1740–80), and Shemon XVI Yohannan (1780–1820).

These names and reign-dates were first given towards the end of the 19th century by the Anglican missionary William Ainger Wigram. A recently discovered list of Qudshanis patriarchs compiled after the First World War by the bishop Eliya of Alqosh, however, gives a completely different set of dates:  Shemon X (1600–39); Shemon XI (1639–53); Shemon XII (1653–92); Shemon XIII Denha (1692–1700); and Shemon XIV Shlemun (1700–17).

Catholic 
In 1681 a Catholic line of patriarchs who took the name Joseph was founded at Amid (Diyarbakr). The Patriarch of this church were: Joseph I (1681–95); Joseph II (1696–1712); Joseph III (1713–57); Joseph IV (patriarch, 1757–80; patriarchal administrator, 1781–96); and Joseph V (1804–28).  Strictly speaking, Augustine Hindi, who styled himself Joseph V, was merely the patriarchal administrator of the Amid and Mosul patriarchates, but he liked to think of himself as a patriarch and the Vatican found it politic to indulge him in this fantasy.

Patriarchal succession, 19th and 20th centuries and at present 
There were three Qudshanis patriarchs in the decades leading up to the First World War: Shemon XVII Abraham (1820–61), Shemon XVIII Rubil (1861–1903), and Shemon XIX Benjamin (1903–18), who was consecrated at an uncanonically early age.  Shemon XIX Benjamin (1903–18) was murdered in the village of Kohnashahr in the Salmas district in 1918, and was succeeded by the feeble Shemon XX Paul (1918–20). Paul died only two years after taking office. As there were no other qualified members of the patriarchal family available, he was succeeded by his twelve-year-old nephew Eshai, who was consecrated patriarch on 20 June 1920 under the name Shemon XXI Eshai.

Shemon XXI Eshai was murdered in the United States in 1975 and succeeded in 1976 by Dinkha IV Hnanya, the first non-Patriarch of the Church of the East to be appointed not by hereditary succession since the 15th century. Dinkha IV was succeeded by Gewargis III. Following the resignation of Gewargis III on 6 September 2021, he was succeeded by Awa IIl.

Catholic 
The recognition of the Mosul patriarch Yohannan VIII Hormizd of the by the Vatican in 1830 marked the birth of the Chaldean Catholic Church. Yohannan Hormizd died in 1838, and was succeeded by Joseph VI Audo (1848–1878), Nicholas I Zaya (1840–1847), Eliya Abulyonan (1879–1894), Abdisho V Khayyat (1895–1899), Emmanuel II Thomas (1900–1947), Joseph VII Ghanima (1947–1958), Paul II Cheikho (1958–1989) and Raphael I Bidawid (1989–2003).  Patriarch Emmanuel III Delly was consecrated in 2003 and abdicated on 19 December 2012. He was succeeded by Louis Raphaël I Sako since  31 January 2013 to the present as the Chaldean Patriarch of Babylon.

See also 
Ancient Christianity in the Indian subcontinent
 East Syriac Rite
 List of patriarchs of the Church of the East
 Patriarchal Province of Seleucia-Ctesiphon
 Church of the East
 Schism of 1552
 Chaldean Catholic Church
 Assyrian Church of the East
 Ancient Church of the East
 India (East Syriac ecclesiastical province)
Primate of the East Indies
 Synod of Diamper
 Syro-Malabar Church
 Church of the East in China
 List of Chaldean Catholic patriarchs of Babylon
 List of patriarchs of the Assyrian Church of the East
 List of patriarchs of the Ancient Church of the East

References

Sources 

 
 
 
 
 
 
 
 
 
 
 
 
 
 
 
 
 
 
 
 
 
 
 
 
 
 
 
 
 
 
 

 
 
 
Assyrian Church of the East-related lists